The International Trade Awards, held for the first time in 2007, are the UK's premier awards devoted exclusively to recognising excellence in import, export and international trade achievement.

This is a series of twelve regional International Trade Awards. Winners from each region are announced at presentation ceremonies held from February through to December with the winners automatically progressing as national finalists.

Objectives 

The objectives of the awards are to:

 Identify and reward the UK's most successful and innovative exporters
 Promote the UK's top exporters as corporate role models in order to stimulate greater involvement in international trade amongst UK businesses
 Promote the leading exporters of local and regional areas to encourage international trade by all companies irrespective of size and location
 Further develop community awareness of the importance of exporting to the UK's economic future

Sponsor 

The International Trade Awards are sponsored by HSBC.

2007 winners 

The 2007 regional winners were:

 Long O'Donnell Associates (North West winner)
 Immunodiagnostic Systems (North East winner)
 Nisa (Yorkshire and Humberside winner)
 Geothermal International (West Midlands winner)
 University of Nottingham (East Midlands winner)
 GigaSat (East of England winner)
 Star Syringe (South East winner)
 The Ford Farm (South West winner)
 MET Studio Design (London winner)
 Randox Laboratories (Northern Ireland winner)
 Daniels Fans (Welsh winner)
 4i2i Communications (Scotland winner)

The 2007 national winners announced at The House of Lords on 2 April 2008 were:

 Star Syringe (Innovation Category winner)
 The Ford Farm (SME Category winner)
 GigaSat (Overall winner)

2008 winners 

The 2008 regional winners are:

 James Halstead (North West winner)
 Davy Roll (North East winner)
 Penn Pharmaceutical Services (Wales winner)

See also 
List of the largest trading partners of United Kingdom

References

External links 
 International Trade Awards homepage
 International Trade Awards 2007 winners and finalists, International Trade Today Magazine, April 2008

English awards
Business and industry awards
Foreign trade of the United Kingdom